At least three warships of Japan have borne the name Uranami:

 , a  launched in 1907 and stricken in 1930
 , a  launched in 1928 and sunk in 1944
 , an  launched in 1957 and stricken in 1986

Japanese Navy ship names
Imperial Japanese Navy ship names